Jerome Michael Adams (born September 22, 1974) is an American anesthesiologist and a former vice admiral in the U.S. Public Health Service Commissioned Corps who served as the 20th surgeon general of the United States from September 5, 2017 until January 20, 2021. Prior to becoming Surgeon General, he served as the Indiana state health commissioner, from 2014 to 2017. On June 29, 2017, President Donald Trump nominated Adams to become Surgeon General of the United States. Adams was confirmed by the United States Senate on August 3, 2017.

Early life and education
Adams is the son of Richard and Edrena Adams of Mechanicsville, Maryland, and grew up on the family farm. He attended Chopticon High School, graduating in 1992, in the top 5% of his class.  He then attended the University of Maryland Baltimore County through a full-tuition Meyerhoff Scholarship, a grant dedicated to minority students interested in the sciences. Adams received his Bachelor of Science in biochemistry and his Bachelor of Arts in biopsychology. Additionally, Adams studied abroad in the Netherlands and Zimbabwe.

Adams attended medical school at Indiana University School of Medicine as an Eli Lilly and Company Scholar. He also received a  Master of Public Health degree from the University of California, Berkeley, in 2000, with a focus on chronic disease prevention. Adams completed his internship in internal medicine (2002–2003) at St. Vincent Indianapolis Hospital and his residency in anesthesiology (2003–2006) at Indiana University. He is board certified in anesthesiology.

Career

Private practice and academia
After two years in private practice at Ball Memorial Hospital, Adams was named assistant professor of anesthesiology at Indiana University. He has written several academic papers and book chapters, including chapters in Anesthesia Student Survival Guide: A Case-based Approach, and an editorial in the American Journal of Public Health, "Are Pain Management Questions in Patient Satisfaction Surveys Driving the Opioid Epidemic?"

Indiana state health commissioner
In October 2014, Adams was appointed Indiana state health commissioner. He was originally appointed by Governor Mike Pence and re-appointed by newly elected governor Eric Holcomb in 2017. In this role, he oversaw the Public Health Protection and Laboratory Services, Health and Human Services, Health Care Quality and Regulatory, and Tobacco Prevention and Cessation Commissions. He also served as Secretary of Indiana State Department of Health's Executive Board, as Chairman of the Indiana State Trauma Care Committee, as President of the Healthy Hoosier Foundation, and as Co-chairman of the Indiana Perinatal Quality Improvement Collaborative Governing Council. During an HIV epidemic in 2015, Adams initially opposed needle-exchange programs on "moral" grounds, but he later changed his position as cases continued to mount.

Surgeon General of the United States

On June 29, 2017, President Donald Trump nominated Adams as surgeon general of the United States. He was confirmed to the position by the Senate on August 3, 2017. Upon his confirmation, Adams said that addressing the opioid epidemic along with untreated mental illness would be two of his major priorities.  Adams was sworn in as surgeon general on September 5, 2017, and received his commission shortly after.

In April 2018, Adams urged Americans who are at risk of overdosing on opioids, as well as their family and friends, to carry an over-the-counter antidote to help combat rising fatalities. In May 2018, Adams responded to an in-flight medical emergency on a flight to Jackson, Mississippi.

In September 2018, Adams began a campaign along with other public health officials to promote seasonal flu vaccinations. The 2017 flu epidemic had resulted in the deaths of an estimated 80,000 Americans, the highest number of deaths in at least four decades, according to CDC director Robert Redfield. Of the 180 children who died, 80 percent were unvaccinated.

COVID-19 pandemic

In February 2020, Adams was appointed to the task force for dealing with the COVID-19 pandemic. Adams initially downplayed the risk from COVID-19 by comparing it to the flu, which was criticized by experts. He also strongly implored people not to buy or use face masks because he said they were “NOT effective” in preventing the general public from catching COVID-19, and that wearing a mask could actually increase the risk of catching the virus. This was in line with other health experts, including Anthony Fauci, who were working on limited information at the time. Adams later retracted this recommendation because he said there was new information about the asymptomatic spread of the virus. 

When asked about African-Americans’ increased risks from COVID, Adams replied that “African-Americans and Latinos should avoid alcohol, drugs and tobacco. Do it for your abuela, do it for your granddaddy, do it for your big momma, do it for your pop-pop.” Public health experts criticized his assertions as misleading and lacking adequate context.

Adams expressed concern that the George Floyd protests could lead to a spike in COVID-19 cases. According to Adams, "Based on the way the disease spreads, there is every reason to expect that we will see new clusters and potentially new outbreaks moving forward."

Adams confirmed that he was asked to step down as Surgeon General by the incoming Biden administration. Former surgeon general Vivek Murthy took his place. He officially resigned on January 20, 2021 at the request of President Joe Biden.

Following his service as surgeon general, Adams joined Purdue University in October 2021 as a Presidential Fellow and its first executive director of health equity initiatives, professor of practice in the departments of Pharmacy Practice and Public Health, and a faculty member of the Regenstrief Center for Healthcare Engineering.

Personal life
Adams is Catholic, and he and his wife Lacey have three children.

Awards and decorations

References

External links

 Office of the Surgeon General (OSG)
 
 

1974 births
Living people
African-American physicians
American anesthesiologists
Indiana University School of Medicine alumni
Physicians from Indiana
Physicians from Maryland
Recipients of the Public Health Service Distinguished Service Medal
State cabinet secretaries of Indiana
State health commissioners of the United States
Surgeons General of the United States
Trump administration personnel
United States Public Health Service personnel
United States Public Health Service Commissioned Corps officers
United States Public Health Service Commissioned Corps admirals
UC Berkeley School of Public Health alumni
University of Maryland, Baltimore County alumni
African-American Catholics